The following is a list of state highways in the U.S. state of Louisiana designated in prior to the 1955 Louisiana Highway renumbering. All were part of the original 98 state highways authorized by the state legislature in 1921.


List

See also

References

Louisiana Highways @ AARoads (includes a route log)
Louisiana Department of Transportation and Development, State, District, and Parish maps
Louisiana Department of Transportation and Development, Functional Classification Maps

External links
Road Signs of Louisiana

 
State highways